The Glamorous Imperial Concubine (Chinese: 倾世皇妃) is a 2011 Chinese television series based on a novel of the same title by Murong Yin'er (慕容湮儿). Starring Ruby Lin with Kevin Yan and Wallace Huo, it was Lin's producing debut.

Filming for the series started on 19 January 2011 in Hengdian and wrapped up on 6 April 2011. It was first aired in China on HBS on 30 September 2011.

Synopsis
Set under the backdrop of the turbulent Five Dynasties and Ten Kingdom period of 10th century Imperial China, follows the story of a kind and beautiful princess, Ma Fuya of Chu. In one night, her kingdom perished under the hands of the manipulative Ma Yi Fang, Fuya’s uncle. Forced to flee her home after being betrayed and losing everything she loved, she bravely ventures on the path to restoring her kingdom with the help of the mysterious Meng Qiyou, the unfavored prince of Shu. Although he has ulterior motives and uses Fuya as a political tool, he falls in love with her and secretly protects her from danger.

As she hides in Shu, the crown prince of Northern Han, Liu Liancheng who has an unrequited love for Fuya, searches for her desperately.

The exiled princess becomes the subject of the affections of various princes and emperors, entangled in the battle of inner states affairs of Shu and Han as well as raging wars between contending states.

Cast

Main

 Ruby Lin as Ma Fuya (馬馥雅) / Pan Yu (潘玉) / Mei Jing
 Ma Fuya: The beloved princess of the kingdom of Chu who wishes to seek revenge and restore her fallen kingdom. After failing to seek refuge in Northern Han, she forms an alliance with the deposed crown prince of Shu, Meng Qiyou and shelters herself in his kingdom. 
 Pan Yu: At Shu, Meng Qiyou gives her the identity of Pan Yu, the daughter of a lowly magistrate and helps her participate in the beauty selection according to his plans. She becomes the subject of attention due to her beauty and kindness, gaining the affection of Meng Qixing and the respect of Meng Qiyun. Because of this, she also endures many hardships evoked by the spiteful empress of Shu who looks down on her low birth, as well as other selection candidates. Through it all, she and Qiyou rely on each other for support and comfort, eventually falling in love.

 Kevin Yan as Meng Qiyou (孟祈佑)
 The eldest prince of the kingdom of Shu. A mistreated prince who was a subject of reject by his birth mother, Empress Du as well as his adoptive mother Consort Mei. He initially saw Fuya as an essential chess piece to his schemes for the throne but inevitably falls in love with her and secretly shelters her from harm.  
 Wallace Huo as Liu Liancheng (劉連城)
 The devoted Emperor of Northern Han. He harbours unrequited romantic affections for Fuya and searches for her in vain after her kingdom's usurpation. He ends up marrying her cousin, Ma Xiangyun and resents her for separating him from Fuya. His infatuation for Fuya brings out the worse in him as he secretly resorts to questionable means to gain her love and have her by his side.

Supporting 
Mao Zijun as Ma Duyun, Ma Fuya's younger brother. After the memory loss, he was raised by Lianxi.
Jennifer Hong as Ma Xiangyun
Tony Yang as Liu Lianxi
Qui Shuang as Meng Qixing
Liu Zijiao as Liu Liansi
Kara Hui as Du Feihong, Empress of Shu. Qiyou's and Qixing's mother.
Wang Lin as Han Zhaoyi, Emperor of Shu's consort
Dai Chunrong as Dowager Dugu, mother of Liancheng and Liansi. 
Qiu Shuang as Meng Qixing, Third prince of Shu.
Miao Haojun as Hua Ziqiao, eunuch Hua of Chu.
Kang Qunzhi as Lin Muyi, Empress of Chu. Fuya's mother.
Jiang Kai as Meng Zhixiang, Emperor of Shu. 
Liu Tao as Wen Jingruo, Lady Jing. She is in love with Qiyou.
Wang Yu as Meng Qiyun, Second prince.  Qiyou’s half-brother whose mother is Meiying.
Zheng Kai as Han Ming, General of Later Shu. He loves Han Zhaoyi.
Yang Kaichun as Yunzhu, Palace maid. Fuya's best friend.
Liu Yong as Ma Yin, Ruler of Chu. Fuya's father.
Hao Zejia as Du Wan, niece of Empress Du. She married Qixing.
Chen Chen as Su Yao. Fuya's friend, executed for being a spy.
Hao Luofan as Xiaoxingan. Fuya's faithful family maid. 
Sun Xi as Mo Chou. White haired faithful servant of Empress Du.
Bai Jie as Ping Zi
Qiao Renliang as Zhao Kuangyin
Zhou Yiwei as Chai Rong, prince of Zhou
Zhang Xiaochen as Shenzhi, prince of Min
Wu Xin
Du Haitao

Soundtrack

Awards and nominations

International broadcast

References

External links
 The Glamorous Imperial Concubine at Sina.com
 The Glamorous Imperial Concubines official weibo
 The Glamorous Imperial Concubine at HBS
 The Glamorous Imperial Concubine at QQ.com
 The Glamorous Imperial Concubine at CTV website

2011 Chinese television series debuts
Television shows based on Chinese novels
Television series set in the Five Dynasties and Ten Kingdoms period
Chinese historical television series
Hunan Television dramas